Macauley Island is a volcanic island in New Zealand's Kermadec Islands, approximately halfway between New Zealand's North Island and Tonga in the southwest Pacific Ocean. Two islets, Haszard Island and Newcome Rock, lie east offshore of Macauley Island. The island is mostly surrounded by high cliffs that make accessing it difficult; the inland parts are mostly gently sloping terrain covered with ferns and grasses.

The island was formed during several volcanic episodes that produced mainly basaltic rocks as lava flows. Later, the Haszard Formation built most of the current surface of Macauley Island. Two uncertain eruptions took place during the 19th century offshore Macauley Island; a hydrothermal vent system is active on Macauley Cone in the caldera.

Macauley Island is an important breeding place for numerous seabirds, which come on land only to reproduce. While the island is uninhabited, Polynesians and during the 19th century whalers introduced goats, pigs and rats which damaged the island's ecosystem. During the 20th and 21st century these invasive species were largely eradicated, leading to a recovery of the previous vegetation. The island is part of a protected area.

Geography and geomorphology 

Cheeseman Island and Curtis Island lie south-southwest of Macauley Island, and Havre and L'Esperance Rock are even farther south; together these islands form the southern group of the Kermadec Islands, of which Macauley Island is the largest. Under good conditions Raoul Island can be seen from Macauley Island. Located within the exclusive economic zone of New Zealand, the islands are since 1990 within the Kermadec Islands Marine Reserve and the Kermadec Benthic Protected Area administered by the New Zealand Department of Conservation. The islands are, with the exception of the weather station on Raoul Island, uninhabited.

The caldera is elongated in east-northeast direction and features north-northeast trending lineaments that extend to Macauley Island. Jumbled blocks, presumably from landslides or slumps, cover the portions of the caldera adjacent to Macauley Island, and there is evidence of collapses on the western caldera margin. A fault runs inside the caldera next to its southeastern margin. The caldera floor is covered with pumice, and thick pumice deposits occur on the flanks of Macauley volcano.

Parasitic vents and structures have been identified on the caldera rim and submarine slopes of Macauley Island volcano during bathymetric analysis, some are the source of lava flows that extend into the caldera and down the flanks.

The seafloor on the slopes of Macauley volcano is covered with sand, rock, breccia and bacterial mats. These waves appear to have formed in part during sector collapses and in part during density flows triggered by eruptions; the size of the latter waves may be indicative of the large size of eruptions. The submarine slopes are dissected by canyons and channels.

Macauley Island

Parts of the volcano emerge above sea level, forming Macauley Island, Haszard Island and Newcombe Rock. Macauley Island was also known as Green Island.

Seen from the north the island has the shape of a wedge, while it has a more rounded shape when seen from the east.

Most of the island is a gently tilted plateau, cut by gullies and ravines which are the only way to reach the inside of the island. Flowing water only occurs after rainfall. The island is geologically unstable, with beaches and landforms frequently shifting due to erosion during rainfall and tropical cyclones, but also due to earthquakes. A castaway depot was established on the northeastern side of Macauley Island in 1888.

Boulder, gravel and sand beaches occur at some places, while others have steep rocky slopes at subtidal depths with crevices, caves and overhangs. At its northwestern end west of Mount Haszard, the steep Perpendicular Cliff drops into the southern part of the caldera. The structure of the shield volcano with lava flows, tephra and two volcanic craters crop out in the cliff. South and southwest of Mount Haszard are two more craters known as Haszard Crater and Macauley Crater.

Its name is derived from Henry Douglas Morpeth Haszard (at first, it was named Roaches' Isle), and, like that of Mount Haszard, is often spelled as Hazard. Newcombe Rock - also known as Haszardette - is located northeast of Haszard Island and may be part of the same edifice, separate from the Macauley Island one. Three more emergent rocks are found northeast and southwest of Haszard Island and south of Macauley Island, and a shallow rock named Mac Donald lies reportedly a few kilometres off Mount Haszard.

Geology 

This subduction has given rise to the Tonga-Kermadec volcanic arc, which is subdivided at 25.6° latitude (where the Louisville seamount chain subducts in the trench) in the northern Tonga and the southern Kermadec arc.

The Kermadec arc consists mainly of 33 submarine volcanoes and calderas and extends from White Island next to New Zealand to Raoul Island; most of these volcanoes however are submarine. Volcanism began in the Pliocene and has occurred at the present-day location of the Tonga-Kermadec Ridge for about one million years. Many of the volcanoes were discovered using bathymetry, and about 80% show hydrothermal activity. Because of its mostly submarine location, volcanism in the Kermadec arc is poorly understood.

The Kermadec Islands are the emergent part of the Kermadec arc, and most of the ridge lies at over  depth. This trough separates the Kermadec microplate from the Australian plate and it and the Lau Basin began to form through crustal spreading 6 million years ago; the lineaments of the Macauley caldera appear to match these of the Havre Trough. The Kermadec-Havre system is considered to be an archetype of a backarc-volcanic arc system.

Composition 

Most of the rocks on Macauley Island have a basaltic composition, which define an alumina-rich to tholeiitic suite with intermediate potassium contents. The rocks contain olivine and pyroxene phenocrysts with rare glass, and the Sandy Bay Tephra contains augite, hypersthene, ilmenite, magnetite and plagioclase. There is a single instance of dacite and rhyolite in Sandy Bay Tephra, and evidence for earlier felsic eruptions; with the exception of that Macauley Island rocks have a largely uniform composition. Magma mingling processes appear to have occurred prior to the eruption of the Sandy Bay Tephra.

Gabbro and basalts with different compositions occur as xenoliths and resemble Raoul Island rocks. Chemical alteration has given rise to gypsum, hematite, kaolinite, montmorillonite, natroalunite and tridymite. The altered rocks have pink and red colours and there are occurrences of palagonite. Hyaloclastite is found in the sea at shallow depths and ferromanganese crusts have been dredged from the submarine flanks of Macauley Island.

The volcano is believed to consist mostly of basaltic rocks. The occurrence of felsic rocks at Macauley Island and elsewhere in the Tonga-Kermadec volcanic arc is unexpected. Processes where magma ascending into the lower crust heats it until it melts (anatexis) and dehydrates have been invoked to explain the felsic volcanism in the Kermadec arc. In contrast, an origin through fractional crystallization of basaltic magmas is unlikely for a number of reasons. The backarc extension in the Havre Trough, where tectonic lineaments match the trend of the Macauley caldera and of Denham Caldera on Raoul Island, may also have influenced the explosive activity at both calderas.

Climate and oceanic conditions 

In summer, winds blow from east and southeast and the rest of the year from northwest. Mean sunshine duration per year is about 2100 hours.

The Kermadec Islands are largely exposed to oceanic swells coming from all directions. Ocean current regimes in this area of the Pacific Ocean are poorly known and appear to be seasonal, with northerly currents during summer and southeasterly ones the rest of the year. Waters are salty and clear.

Ecosystem 

Most of the island is covered by beadfern and sedgeland, trees are rare. Several vegetation associations occur, such as turf along the coasts, lichens and mosses on the northwestern cliffs, sedgelands mostly at the periphery of the island, shrubs at various sites and dwarf ngaio and Homalanthus forests. Moisture-loving plants occur in the canyons and gullies. 68 plant species were recorded on Macauley Island in 2008, and there are bryophytes, lichens, lycophytes, pteridophytes, seaweeds and spermatophytes. One fungus was recorded in 2015, the artist's conk. There have been historical changes in vegetation due to the introduction and eradication of pigs and goats and a spread of ferns that may be due to climatic changes.

Macauley Island has the largest seabird population of New Zealand. Seabirds live on the sea and come to land only to breed; birds found breeding on Macauley Island include black noddies, black-winged petrels, grey noddies, Kermadec parakeets, Kermadec petrels, little shearwaters, masked boobies, red-tailed tropicbirds, sooty terns, wedge-tailed shearwaters, white-bellied storm petrels and white-naped petrels. Of these, the Kermadec parakeet is the only land bird on Macauley Island. Catastrophic volcanic eruptions that periodically wipe the animals out may be the reason why Macauley Island and other Kermadec islands lack endemic birds. In 1988, 5.2 million breeding birds were reported. They nest mainly in the sedgelands and cliffs, and both Macauley and Haszard Island are heavily burrowed by nesting seabirds. Birds may fly from the colonies on Macauley Island to islands farther west, such as Balls Pyramid and Lord Howe Island.

Invertebrates reported from the islands include ants, beetles, butterflies, centipedes, crickets, flies, moths, orthopterans, snails and spiders although centipedes were not recorded in 2011 and millipedes and earthworms were absent as well.

Marine organisms

Unlike the land-based fauna, the marine flora and fauna of the Kermadec Islands is mostly tropical and subtropical. It resembles that of Lord Howe Island more than that of New Zealand and there are reef-building corals. These reefs are dominated by algae with proper corals covering less than one percent of the ground; there are no proper coral reefs at Macauley Island presumably owing to the only marginally suitable water temperatures, as has been observed at other subtropical sites. Spiny kelp occur at Macauley Island, the northernmost occurrence of this species.

Squids, sharks, dolphins and crown-of-thorns starfish occur at Macauley Island. Other animal taxa include ascidians, bivalves, bony fish, cartilaginous fish, crabs, crinoids, echinoids, eels, gastropods, hermit crabs, hydrozoans, nudibranchs, ophiuroids, polychelida, porifers, sea anemones, sea pens, sea stars, soft corals, stony corals, tube worms and tunicates. Animal density is higher in the areas of hydrothermal venting. About 105 mollusc taxa and numerous bryozoan species have been identified in the surrounding sea. Species discovered at Macauley Island and other Kermadec volcanoes are the crabs Gandalfus puia (Macauley Island and submarine volcanoes farther south) and Xenograpsus ngatama (Macauley Island and Brothers volcano), the crustacean Munidopsis maunga (Macauley caldera), and the mussel Vulcanidas isolatus (at Macauley Island and Giggenbach volcano).

Human activity and ecological impacts

The Polynesian rat was presumably introduced by Polynesians, while goats and pigs were introduced presumably by whalers in the 19th century probably as an emergency food supply for shipwrecked sailors; whalers also burned the shrubs of the island. The island was reported in 1789 to be heavily populated by rats and mice. While not as severe as at Raoul Island, these introduced animals altered the ecosystem of the island, preying on birds and confining many plant species to inaccessible cliffs; they might be responsible for the absence of several birds known from Raoul Island on Macauley Island and for changes in the vegetation of Macauley Island between human visits during the 20th century. Additionally, plants may have been imported by later visitors or birds and flotsam/marine debris arriving from New Zealand is frequently reported.

In the late 20th century, there have been efforts to eradicate introduced species from the Kermadec Islands. Pigs had died out by 1910 and goats were removed in the 1960s by the New Zealand Wildlife Service; about 3,200 goats were killed during that occasion. After an initial delay due to concerns that toxic baits used for rat removal could impact parakeet populations, in 2006 the New Zealand Department of Conservation began an effort to eradicate the Polynesian rat. This eradication programme was probably successful, leading to the recovery of a more diverse fern-sedge vegetation that may be still underway  and could lead to a future reduction of fern occurrences. Rats and other rodents have never been reported from Haszard Island. Since the establishment of the Kermadec Islands Marine Reserve, certain activities such as discharging wastewaters, fishing, mining and laying submarine cables are prohibited around Macauley Island.

Eruption history 

The history of Macauley Island is easily recognizable from the cliffs on its northern side, where five geological formations crop out; from bottom to top these are the North Cliff Lavas, the Boulder Beach Formation, the Annexation Lavas, the Sandy Bay Tephra and the Haszard Formation. An additional formation, the Grand Canyon Formation, crops out in the east of the island. Tephra layers dating to 130,000, over 40,000 years and 30,000 years old identified in marine cores around Macauley Island may originate from eruptions there.

Rocks dip away from the northwestern side of the island and all the rocks appear to have been emplaced above sea level; there is no evidence for orogenic deformation although the presence of subaqueous lava flows indicates that recent eruptions occurred during a time of low sea level. During the sea level lowstand of the last glacial period, a much larger area of the island was exposed above sea level.

Pumices dredged from Macauley Island bear evidence of having formed through a unique process ("Tangaroan eruption"), where expanding magma forms a foam-like structure that fragments into numerous spherical pieces. These pieces upon contacting water solidify on the outside but remain molten on the inside. These pumice deposits are distinct from the Sandy Bay Tephra deposits and probably formed during additional eruptions. The chemistry and density of Macauley Island pumices indicate a complex volcanic history.

Pre-Sandy Bay activity

The lava flows of the North Cliff Lavas are the oldest formation that crops out, and are part of a shield volcano with at least one crater. Little erosion took place before phreatomagmatic eruptions emplaced the tephras and lavas of the Boulder Beach Formation, presumably after water had entered the vent. Dykes, most of which are correlated to the Annexation Lavas, are intruded into the Boulder Beach Formation.

The Annexation Lavas are widespread on Macauley Island and also occur at Haszard Island and Newcombe Rock. Dykes fed lava to additional vents, including the Newcombe Rock volcanic plug. Lava also ponded in a crater that crops out in Perpendicular Cliffs; the ponded lava which was originally interpreted as a volcanic intrusion. Along with volcanic activity, tectonic activity increased during the Annexation Lavas stage, giving rise to normal faulting and subsidence; at the end of the stage a summit crater was left.

Sandy Bay eruption 

The Sandy Bay Tephra was erupted 7,200 or 6,310 years ago during the formation of the Macauley caldera from a shallow submarine vent close to Macauley Island, and is named after Sandy Bay. Its total volume is poorly known, an estimate of  inferred from the caldera volume would make the eruption that gave rise to Sandy Bay Tephra one of the largest volcanic eruptions during the Holocene but it is possible that the Macauley caldera formed during multiple eruptions. A submarine eruption jet breached the sea surface, producing at least thirty successive pyroclastic flows, pyroclastic surges and tephra fallout episodes on Macauley Island. The eruption products buried and sometimes eroded earlier deposits. The flows were cold, most likely from interaction with seawater. The flows buried the scrubby vegetation on Macauley Island, leaving wood casts in the rocks.

The Sandy Bay Tephra has a conspicuous white colour, contrasting with the dark colours of the rest of Macauley Island. It consists of dacitic tephra, which forms layered deposits containing lapilli, pumice, sand and fine volcanic ash. The total volume of Sandy Bay Tephra on Macauley Island is about  but it is likely that the total volume of the tephra was considerably larger. Erosion has affected the Sandy Bay Tephra, leaving cliffs around Haszard Islet.

Tephra from the Sandy Bay eruption has been identified in sediment cores taken around the island and formed concentric ridges on the western flank of submarine Macauley. It is likely that the eruption produced large amounts of pumice, which would have been transported by ocean currents to other islands in the Southwest Pacific. Caldera collapse and collapses of caldera flanks perhaps produced tsunamis which may have hit the Bay of Plenty region of New Zealand. The Sandy Bay Tephra is the only demonstrated felsic eruption at Macauley volcano; the presence of obsidian and pitchstone in the Sandy Bay Tephra indicate that earlier felsic eruptions took place, but their dates are unknown.

Haszard Formation 

The Haszard Formation makes up the bulk of exposed Macauley Island rocks. It includes the Parakeet Tuff, Haszard Scoria and Cascade Lava Members, which probably were produced by the same eruptive episode. The lavas were overlaid by the bedded Haszard Scoria. Submarine phreatomagmatic activity generated the Parakeet Tuff, which was erupted along with the Haszard Scoria and consists of lapilli and volcanic ash.

Their emplacement may have begun decades or centuries after the Sandy Bay Tephra eruption, during which rainfall eroded the Sandy Bay Tephra and formed valleys later filled by the Haszard Formation. The eruption was centered at the crater of the Annexation Lavas and on flank vents and reached sub-Plinian dimensions; the crater eventually collapsed below sea level, perhaps during the slumping of the southeastern flank of Macauley Caldera, but the eruption continued as a Surtseyan eruption. Several small phreatic craters on southern Macauley Island probably relate to the Haszard Formation, as does the Grand Canyon Formation formed in a lake formed through the damming of a valley at the eastern end of the island.

Historical eruptions and hydrothermal activity 

Macauley Island is considered to be a dormant volcano. These locations may be erroneous given the absence of bathymetric structures coinciding with their location, but they may be historical eruptions of the Macauley Island volcano. There are anecdotal reports of earthquakes, and a faint smell of sulfur was reported at the northern cliffs, next to the oldest rocks of Macauley Island.

Hydrothermal activity occurs in the submarine Macauley Cone, where white fluids and occasional bubbles emanate from rocks and chimney-shaped vents. Elemental sulfur occurs around the vents, which release warm acidic mineral-rich waters  with a brine-like composition and intense hydrothermal plumes. These waters may be derived from magmatic fluids and their helium isotope ratios appear to vary between observations. The influence of the hydrothermal emanations extend  from the volcano. One or two additional vent sites are suspected to exist in the Macauley Caldera. There is evidence that a lake of molten sulfur once filled the Macauley Cone crater and left sulfur deposits with thicknesses exceeding .

A vent biota has become established around the hydrothermal vents consisting of mussels: Vulcanidas isolatus at shallow depths and Gigantidas gladius at both shallow and intermediate depths. Sea stars prey on them while crabs and tonguefish graze at the sulfurous crater walls. The hydrothermal activity occurs at shallow depths, thus fluids can enter the photic zone where biological productivity is highest.

History 

Macauley Island was first discovered on 30 June 1788 by the Lady Penrhyn, but it is likely that Polynesians visited the island during the last 700 years despite the lack of direct archaeological evidence other than an obsidian flake discovered in 2015. They may have obtained obsidian from the island. The island was originally named Macaulay, after George Mackenzie McCaulay, alderman of the City of London who had contracted the voyage of the Lady Penrhyn.

Macauley Island and other Kermadec islands are part of New Zealand's territory since the 19th century; early explorers envisaged planting trees on Macauley Island and using the Kermadec islands as places to settle from New Zealand, and in 1957 were briefly considered as a potential testing ground for the British nuclear weapons programme. Archaeological excavations were conducted in 1990.

See also

 New Zealand outlying islands
 List of volcanoes in New Zealand
 List of islands of New Zealand
 List of islands
 Island restoration
 Desert island

References

Sources

External links 

 
 
 
Department of Conservation - Kermadec Islands page
Map of Macauley and Giggenbach submarine volcanoes—Picture of island and article by Ian Wright, Ocean Geology, National Institute of Water and Atmospheric Research, Wellington, New Zealand
Te Ara - the Encyclopaedia of New Zealand - "The last goat on Macauley Island"

Islands of the Kermadec Islands
Volcanic islands of New Zealand
VEI-7 volcanoes
Volcanoes of the New Zealand outlying islands
Calderas of New Zealand
Submarine calderas
Holocene calderas
Quaternary Oceania
Inactive volcanoes
Uninhabited islands of New Zealand
Island restoration
Important Bird Areas of the Kermadec Islands